Coffeyville Community College (CCC) is a community college located in Coffeyville, Kansas, United States.  It was founded in 1923.

Coffeyville Community College is a member of the Kansas Jayhawk Community College Conference and the National Junior College Athletic Association.  Coffeyville Community College offers football, basketball, baseball, softball, cross country, track and field, golf, volleyball, rodeo, and soccer.

The official school colors are red and white. The mascot is the Red Raven. Their athletic teams are known as the Red Ravens (men) and Lady Ravens (women).

History
Coffeyville Community College was established in 1923, and was among the first such institutions to be chartered by the State of Kansas. It was founded at the request of the voters of the Coffeyville school district to provide two years of college for students who, at that time, had graduated from Coffeyville High School.

From the beginning, the college has been advised by the University of Kansas. Together, they developed the various courses and departments at the college. Since that time, the college has maintained a close relationship with the University of Kansas, and all other Kansas Regents Institutions, to provide for effective operation and transfer of credits. In 1965, the college became a member of the State System of Public Junior Colleges and the name officially became Coffeyville Community Junior College. Soon after, the voters of the southern one-half of Montgomery County voted to expand the college district to include the entire southern half of the county instead of just the City of Coffeyville. The first Board of Trustees was elected in 1967. In 1980, the college name was officially changed to Coffeyville Community College by an act of the State Legislature. In 2001, the Southeast Kansas Area Vocational Technical School merged with Coffeyville Community College.

Athletics

Coffeyville Community College has sent forty-eight players to the NFL over the years.

Notable alumni

Larry Asante, safety, Oakland Raiders
 Akin Ayodele, NFL linebacker, free agent
 Gary Busey, actor
 James Carpenter, offensive guard, Seattle Seahawks
 Duron Carter, wide receiver, Canadian Football League
 Buster Douglas, world heavyweight boxing champion
 Maurice "Lil Mo" Douglass, former defensive back, Chicago Bears
 Reggie Evans, NBA Free Agent
 Andre De Grasse, 200m Gold medalist/100m bronze medalist, 2020 Olympic Games, 200m Silver medalist/100m bronze medalist, 2016 Olympic Games
 Mel Gray, former return specialist, Detroit Lions
 Tim Jackson, football player
 Brandon Jacobs, former running back, NFL
 Ryan Lilja, former offensive lineman, Indianapolis Colts and Kansas City Chiefs
 Pete Mills, former wide receiver, Buffalo Bills (AFL)
 Reggie Nelson, safety, Oakland Raiders
 Quinton Patton, wide receiver, San Francisco 49ers
 Mike Rozier, former running back, NFL, 1983 Heisman Trophy winner
 Henry Schichtle, football player
 Kurt Schottenheimer, former defensive coordinator, NFL
 Devin Smith, professional basketball player, Maccabi Tel Aviv
 Paul Soliai, defensive tackle, Miami Dolphins
 Ron Springs, football player
 Siran Stacy, former football player, Philadelphia Eagles
 Devin Thomas, wide receiver, Washington Redskins
 Willie Townes, former defensive end, Dallas Cowboys and New Orleans Saints 
 Keith Traylor, former defensive lineman, Kansas City Chiefs
 Jeff Wright, defensive tackle, Buffalo Bills

References

External links
 

 
Education in Montgomery County, Kansas
Educational institutions established in 1923
Buildings and structures in Montgomery County, Kansas
Community colleges in Kansas
Two-year colleges in the United States
NJCAA athletics
1923 establishments in Kansas